"In My Mind" is a song by American recording artist Shannon Sanders from his debut studio album, Outta Nowhere (1999). The song was covered by Trinidadian recording artist Heather Headley for her second studio album of the same name (2006). It was released on September 27, 2005 as the album's lead single, peaking at number seventy-five on the Billboard Hot 100 in early April 2006, while the song's remixes by the Freemasons and Dave Hernandez topped the Hot Dance Club Play.

Headley's version of the track appeared on the April 20, 2008 episode of the comedy-drama television series The Game, titled "Bury My Heart at Wounded Knee". In 2021, Headley's version was sampled by Nicki Minaj, Drake and Lil Wayne for the song "Seeing Green", from the reissue of Minaj's 2009 mixtape Beam Me Up Scotty.

Music video
The music video for "In My Mind" was directed by Diane Martel and premiered on January 19, 2006 via Yahoo! The video opens with Headley at home at dawn, lying on a couch, in the kitchen, and watching television, intercut with scenes of her watching her ex-boyfriend kissing another girl across the street. Next, the video switches in and out of Headley singing and talking to her ex-boyfriend's mother, who hugs her near the end of the second verse. She is shown walking with her ex, and as the bridge begins, a tear falls from her eye. As the song progresses, Headley is seen singing and holding the boyfriend, switching into scenes where she is standing in place, singing.

Track listings

US digital EP 
"In My Mind" (Freemasons Vocal Club Mix) – 7:41
"In My Mind" (Freemasons Vocal Dub Mix) – 6:40
"In My Mind" (Dave Hernandez Club Mix) – 7:05
"In My Mind" (Dave Hernandez Dub Mix One) – 7:14

US digital EP (Dance Vault Mixes) 
"In My Mind" (Freemasons Radio Mix) – 3:50
"In My Mind" (Freemasons Vocal Club Mix) – 7:41
"In My Mind" (Freemasons Dub Mix) – 6:40
"In My Mind" (Freemasons Club Instrumental) – 7:41
"In My Mind" (Freemasons Club Acappella) – 5:14
"In My Mind" (Dave Hernandez Club Mix) – 7:05
"In My Mind" (Dave Hernandez Dub Mix One) – 7:14
"In My Mind" (Dave Hernandez Dub Mix Two) – 7:14
"In My Mind" (Dave Hernandez Radio Mix) – 4:00
"In My Mind" – 4:06

Personnel
Credits adapted from the liner notes of In My Mind.

 Heather Headley – vocals
 John Catchings – strings
 David Davidson – strings
 Greg Fuqua – engineering
 Serban Ghenea – mixing
 Jon Graves – engineering
 John Hanes – additional Pro Tools
 Mark Linger – engineering
 Dan Needham – drums
 Drew Ramsey – backing vocals, engineering, guitar, production
 Tim Roberts – additional Pro Tools assistance
 Shannon Sanders – backing vocals, keyboards, production
 Tommy Sims – bass
 Debreca Smith – backing vocals
 Bill Whittington – engineering
 Kristin Wilkinson – strings

Charts

Weekly charts

Year-end charts

Release history

See also
 List of number-one dance singles of 2006 (U.S.)

References

1990s ballads
1999 songs
2000s ballads
2005 singles
Music videos directed by Diane Martel
RCA Records singles
Songs written by Shannon Sanders
Contemporary R&B ballads
Soul ballads